"Roam" is a song by American new wave band the B-52's. It was released as the fourth single from their fifth studio album, Cosmic Thing (1989), following "(Shake That) Cosmic Thing", "Channel Z", and "Love Shack". The vocals are sung by Kate Pierson and Cindy Wilson, making it the only vocal track on the album without any vocal involvement from Fred Schneider.

"Roam" became the band's second and final US top-10 hit, peaking at number three on the Billboard Hot 100 in March 1990 and spending a total of 20 weeks on the chart. It was certified gold by the Recording Industry Association of America (RIAA) in April 1990. Worldwide, the song became a top-10 success in Canada, Ireland, and New Zealand, peaking at numbers four, nine, and two, respectively. In February 1991, the B-52's were nominated for a Grammy Award for Best Pop Vocal Performance by a Duo or Group for "Roam".

Music video
The music video for "Roam" was directed by Adam Bernstein and produced by Jonna Mattingly, with Zack Winestine serving as the director of photography. Filmed in New York City, the video contains plentiful animations and stock footage.

Track listings

US maxi-CD single
 "Roam" (7-inch remix) – 5:11
 "Roam" (radio mix) – 4:13
 "Roam" (12-inch remix) – 8:17
 "Bushfire" (LP version) – 4:56
 "Roam" (extended remix) – 5:25
 "Roam" (instrumental) – 5:27

US and Australian 12-inch single
A1. "Roam" (extended remix) – 5:27
A2. "Roam" (instrumental) – 5:25
B1. "Roam" (12-inch remix) – 8:17
B2. "Bushfire" (LP version) – 4:56

US 7-inch and cassette single
A. "Roam" (edit) – 4:05
B. "Bushfire" (LP version) – 4:56

UK 7-inch, CD, and cassette single
 "Roam" (edit)
 "Whammy Kiss" (live)
 "Dance This Mess Around" (live)

UK 12-inch single
A1. "Roam" (radio mix) – 4:13
A2. "Roam" (12-inch remix) – 8:17
B1. "Roam" (12-inch extended mix) – 5:25

Charts

Weekly charts

Year-end charts

Certifications

Cover versions

 The Chipettes covered the song in the 1991 Alvin and the Chipmunks album The Chipmunks Rock the House.
 A parody of the song and video, called "Comb," was a skit on Fast Forward in 1990 as the B-52's began the Australian leg of their Cosmic Tour. The video, which poked fun at Pierson's and Wilson's bouffant wigs, starred Gina Riley, Jane Turner, Michael Veitch and Peter Moon as Kate, Cindy, Fred and Keith respectively.
 The song was performed by the cast of the 2002 stage version of Earth Girls Are Easy.
 The Yayhoos covered the song on their 2006 album Put The Hammer Down.
 Argentine female singer Marcela Morelo covered the song on her 2009 album Otro Plan in a Spanish version.
 Caroline Sunshine covered the song for the soundtrack to the 2012 film Treasure Buddies.

References

1989 singles
1989 songs
1990 singles
The B-52's songs
Reprise Records singles
Song recordings produced by Nile Rodgers
Songs written by Cindy Wilson
Songs written by Fred Schneider
Songs written by Kate Pierson
Songs written by Keith Strickland